Țibirica is a commune in Călărași District, Moldova. It is composed of two villages, Schinoasa and Țibirica.

References

Communes of Călărași District